
Gmina Bałtów is a rural gmina (administrative district) in Ostrowiec County, Świętokrzyskie Voivodeship, in south-central Poland.

Villages
Gmina Bałtów contains the villages and settlements of Antoniów, Bałtów, Bidzińszczyzna, Borcuchy, Lemierze, Maksymilianów, Michałów, Okół, Pętkowice, Rudka Bałtowska, Skarbka, Ulów, Wólka Bałtowska, Wólka Pętkowska, Wólka Trzemecka and Wycinka.

Neighbouring gminas
Gmina Bałtów is bordered by the gminas of Bodzechów, Ćmielów, Sienno and Tarłów.

References
Polish official population figures 2006

Baltow
Ostrowiec County